Bullet (stylized as BULLET) is a 2014 action thriller film starring Danny Trejo as the title character and Jonathan Banks as the villain. The film was directed and co-written by Nick Lyon, with additional writing by Matthew Joynes, Ron Peer and Byron Lester, and was produced by Matthew Joynes and Robert Rodriguez. It follows an undercover police officer-turned-vigilante (Trejo) tracking down the crooks who kidnapped his grandson. Filming took place in Los Angeles, United States. The film was released on Blu-ray and DVD on February 25, 2014 in North America.

Plot
Nearing retirement, maverick Los Angeles-based detective Frank "Bullet" Marasco is assigned to hunt down the notorious drug baron Carlito Kane, following a tipoff from Leroy, who is later whacked to death with a golf club due to interrupting Kane's golf game. Bullet and his team storm one of Kane's hideouts but fail to capture him.

The plot thickens when Governor Johnson's daughter is kidnapped by Kane along with her boyfriend, in a bid to save his son Manuel from execution via lethal injection. Kane streams the execution of the boyfriend on a phone to the Governor and says that his daughter is next if they don't stop the execution of his son. Thereafter, Bullet send his grandson Mario to a community park where Kane exacts revenge on Bullet by kidnapping his grandson. Eventually Bullet himself is abducted too, but only for a brief period of time, as he is able to escape. After a lengthy car chase, Bullet successfully evades Kane and his men but gets ambushed by them once again the next day.

Finally, Bullet calls it quits as a civil servant and resigns, secretly becoming a vigilante and goes to his cousin for weaponry to take Kane down. He proceeds to interrogate one of Kane's aides, killing her in her bathtub after she fails to fully cooperate. Panicking, Kane and his closest subordinates retreat to a desert where Bullet starts to kill Kane's henchmen one by one, including his grandson's four kidnappers. The final showdown between Kane and Bullet has the latter emerge as victor. Bullet reunites with his grandson and rescues Johnson's daughter. The victory is sweetened when Manuel Kane is publicly executed. Bullet, his daughter and his grandson savour the evening at the beach.

Cast
 Danny Trejo as Frank "Bullet" Marasco
 Jonathan Banks as Carlito Kane
 Torsten Voges as Kruger
 Julia Dietze as Brooke Madison 
 Max Perlich as Leroy
 Tinsel Korey as Vanessa
 John Savage as Governor Johnson
 Eve Mauro as Samantha 
 Emilio Rivera as Speedy
 Eric St. John as Estes
 Chuck Hittinger as Kyle
 Isaac C. Singleton Jr. as Promoter
 Alison Ball as Attorney General
 Robert Blanche as Tarvis
 Eric Etebari as Manual Kane

Production

Danny Trejo was cast as the title character, Frank "Bullet" Marasco. Jonathan Banks played the main antagonist of the film, drug cartel leader Carlito Kane. Bullet was directed by Nick Lyon, whilst the script was co-written by Lyon, Joynes Byron Lester, and Ron Peer.  Robert Rodriguez and Matthew Joynes produced the film for American United Media, SC Films International, and Giant Ape Media. Carmen Cabana was the cinematographer. Filming commenced in early February 2013 and took place in Los Angeles.

Release
The film was released in North America on February 25, 2014, and in the UK on March 7. 
There are two versions of Bullet: One edited by Funimation Entertainment, and the Director's Cut. Reportedly a superior version, the Director's Cut is being withheld from distribution.

Reception
 
The film received generally negative reviews. On Rotten Tomatoes the film has an approval rating of 11% based on reviews from 9 critics.

Peter Bradshaw of The Guardian dubbed it as "terrible", "cheapo" and "lazy, rickety nonsense". He awarded it one star out of five.

References

External links
 
 

2014 films
2014 action thriller films
Funimation
American action thriller films
2010s English-language films
Films directed by Nick Lyon
2010s American films